Gérard Cenzato (born 10 January 1951) is a French former professional football player and manager.

Personal life 
In 1979, Cenzato stopped playing football professionally, and returned to amateur football. He simultaneously took a role working for the town of Fontainebleau in the sports service, a role he still worked in as of 2007. During his coaching career, he crossed paths with and coached Clément Chantôme and Claude Makélélé at youth level. In 2005, he became a sports coach in Fontainebleau before retiring later in his life.

References

External links 
 
 

1951 births
Living people
Sportspeople from Créteil
French footballers
French football managers
Association football player-managers
Association football defenders
Association football midfielders
AS Nancy Lorraine players
Le Mans FC players
FC Sens players
SO Cholet players
Paris Saint-Germain F.C. players
Paris FC players
RCP Fontainebleau players
Footballers from Val-de-Marne